Yendry María Villalobos Varela (born 27 May 1984) is a Costa Rican former footballer who has played as a midfielder. She has been a member of the Costa Rica women's national team.

References

1984 births
Living people
Women's association football midfielders
Costa Rican women's footballers
Costa Rica women's international footballers
Pan American Games competitors for Costa Rica
Footballers at the 2011 Pan American Games